The 1969 murder of Diane Maxwell involved the death of Diane Maxwell, a 25-year-old phone operator for Southwestern Bell, who was found raped and killed in a shack in December 1969 in Houston, Texas.

Crime
On December 14, 1969, 25-year-old Diane Maxwell (b. 1944) was walking to her job as a phone operator for Southwestern Bell, but never made it to the building. Later that day, a man by the name of William Bell noticed a man walking away from a shack. When Bell came to look in the shack, he found the raped, dead body of Maxwell and immediately notified police.

However, the case remained unsolved due to the lack of computer technology. In 1986, 17 years after the incident, investigators reopened the case, but could not solve it. The case remained closed until July 2003, 34 years after the murder was committed. A batch of forensics they had performed in 1969 was found by Houston police, who located James Ray Davis, a lifetime criminal. Davis was last convicted of kidnapping a young girl and was suspected to be the perpetrator of the Maxwell rape and murder. DNA evidence confirmed that he did rape her. Davis was convicted of first degree murder (the robbery, rape, and kidnapping statute of limitations had expired) shortly afterward, and was sentenced to life without parole.

Media
In 2008, the case was featured in the Forensic Files episode "Brotherly Love."

Sources

1969 murders in the United States
People murdered in Texas
1969 in Texas
1960s in Houston
Rapes in the United States
Incidents of violence against women
American murder victims
December 1969 events in the United States
1944 births
1969 deaths
Female murder victims
History of women in Texas
https://www.fbi.gov/news/stories/houston-cold-case-solved